The Wasp (often referred to as Nauvoo Wasp) was a weekly Latter Day Saint newspaper edited and published by William Smith in Nauvoo, Illinois, from April 1842 to April 1843. While it was not an official publication of the Church of Jesus Christ of Latter Day Saints, The Wasp was consistently pro-Mormon and its primary target audience was the Latter Day Saint residents of Nauvoo. The Wasp ceased publication when it was replaced by John Taylor's similarly themed Nauvoo Neighbor.

The Wasp has been described as the "secular counterpart" of the Latter Day Saint Church's Times and Seasons. The newspaper dedicated much of its space to answering the criticism by Thomas C. Sharp's and the  anti-Mormon Warsaw Signal directed at the church and Joseph Smith, founder of the Latter Day Saint movement.

See also

The Evening and the Morning Star
Messenger and Advocate
Elders' Journal
Millennial Star
List of Latter Day Saint periodicals

Notes

References
Jerry C. Jolley, "The Sting of the Wasp: Early Nauvoo Newspaper—April 1842 to April 1843", 22 BYU Studies (Fall 1982) 487–496.
Darwin L. Hays, "Nauvoo Neighbor" in Daniel H. Ludlow (ed.) (1992). Encyclopedia of Mormonism. (New York: Macmillan) p. 999.

External links
The Wasp PDF scan on Archive.org (16 April 1842–26 April 1843)
The Wasp : partial archive, HTML format

Defunct weekly newspapers
Newspapers established in 1842
Nauvoo, Illinois
Publications disestablished in 1843
Latter Day Saint movement in Illinois
Defunct newspapers published in Illinois
1842 in Christianity
Church of Christ (Latter Day Saints) periodicals
1842 establishments in Illinois